The 1968 NCAA University Division Basketball Championship Game took place on March 23, 1968 between the North Carolina Tar Heels and UCLA Bruins at Sports Arena in Los Angeles. The matchup was the final one of the thirtieth edition of the single-elimination tournament now known as the NCAA Division I men's basketball tournament — commonly referred to as the NCAA Tournament — organized by the National Collegiate Athletic Association (NCAA). It was used to crown a national champion for men's basketball in the NCAA's University Division, the predecessor to what has been known since 1973 as NCAA Division I.

Box score

Source:

References

Citations

Bibliography

NCAA University Division Basketball Championship Game
NCAA Division I Men's Basketball Championship Games
North Carolina Tar Heels men's basketball
UCLA Bruins men's basketball
Basketball competitions in Los Angeles
College sports in Los Angeles
NCAA University Division Basketball Championship Game
NCAA University Division Basketball Championship Game
NCAA University Division Basketball Championship Game